Norman Myers Chaney (October 18, 1914 – May 29, 1936) was an American child actor, notable for appearing in 19 Our Gang comedies as "Chubby" from 1929 to 1931.

Early life and career
Chaney was born on October 18, 1914 (though Richard Bann and Leonard Maltin's book "The Little Rascals: Life & Times of Our Gang stated he was born in 1918) in Cambridge, Maryland, and became a member of Our Gang at the dawn of the sound era. He relied on an affable personality, a flair for funny dialogue, and a priceless frown of frustration that seemed to swallow up his whole moon face. In fall 1928, Our Gang producer Hal Roach and director Robert F. McGowan began to look for an overweight child actor to replace Joe Cobb in the popular film series. Cobb was twelve years old, and the series was about to transition to sound. Roach and McGowan held a nationwide contest to find a replacement for Cobb. Chaney won this contest in early 1929 and was offered a two-year contract. "He adapted gracefully, and we all liked him, he was a nice fellow," said McGowan of Chaney. His stay with the series was brief, but he made a memorable impression on generations of fans. He was taught the expression of the "slow burn" by the comedian Edgar Kennedy.

At the time, Chaney was only 3' 11" and weighed about 113 pounds (119 cm and 51 kg respectively). He was nicknamed "Chubby" for the series and made his debut in the second sound entry, Railroadin',  appearing in 19 Our Gang films over a period of two years, including shorts such as Boxing Gloves and Teacher's Pet. Norman Chaney and Joe Cobb appeared in three shorts together. Chubby's meatiest moments are in Love Business, in which he competed with Jackie Cooper for the affections of their teacher, Miss Crabtree (bringing her flowers and candy, he coyly proposes, "Don't call me Norman; Call me 'Chubsy-Ubsy'").

By spring 1931, Chaney was getting taller and increasingly heavier. He finished out the 1930–31 season without being offered another contract. Both Chaney and his parents decided he would not pursue acting following his final Our Gang short, Fly My Kite. Chaney's departure occurred during a period of great cast turnover, as Allen Hoskins (a member of the original 1922 cast), Jackie Cooper and Mary Ann Jackson had outgrown the series as well.

Later years and death
After leaving the series, In 1936, Chaney returned to his native Baltimore and attended public school, where he excelled in his studies. In spite of having a normal diet and regular exercise since childhood, he continued to gain weight and eventually topped , though he never grew beyond . His weight continued to increase, and it was discovered that he had a glandular ailment.

Chaney became seriously ill from the stress on his body the rapid weight loss caused and died from myocarditis on May 29, 1936 at age 21, according to his death certificate. He was the first of the regular Our Gang alumni to die.

Chaney was buried in Baltimore Cemetery in his hometown. His grave remained unmarked for 76 years because his mother was not able to afford a marker for him or herself. Even though he was paid a weekly salary for his movie appearances, he never received any royalties or residuals for the films' subsequent uses. An online fundraising drive led by Detroit rock musician MIKAL raised $4,500 for headstones to be placed at the graves of both Chaney and his mother. The etched black granite markers, both of which are 16 inches (40.64 cm) tall and 28 inches (71.12 cm) wide, were unveiled on November 10, 2012.

Filmography
 Railroadin' (1929)
 Lazy Days (1929)
 Boxing Gloves (1929)
 Bouncing Babies (1929)
 Moan and Groan, Inc. (1929)
 Shivering Shakespeare (1930)
 The First Seven Years (1930)
 When the Wind Blows (1930)
 Bear Shooters (1930)
 A Tough Winter (1930)
 Pups Is Pups (1930)
 Teacher's Pet (1930)
 School's Out (1930)
 Helping Grandma (1931)
 Love Business (1931)
 Little Daddy (1931)
 The Stolen Jools (1931)
 Bargain Day (1931)
 Fly My Kite (1931)

References

Bibliography
 John Holmstrom, The Moving Picture Boy: An International Encyclopaedia from 1895 to 1995, Norwich, Michael Russell, 1996, p. 85.

External links

 

American male child actors
American male film actors
Male actors from Baltimore
1914 births
1936 deaths
20th-century American male actors
People from Cambridge, Maryland
American male comedy actors
Hal Roach Studios actors
Our Gang